Steinach is a town in the district of Sonneberg, in Thuringia, Germany. It is situated in the Thuringian Forest, 12 km north of Sonneberg.

People 
 Wolf Bauer (born 1939), German politician (CDU)
 Horst Queck (born 1943), German ski jumper

References

Sonneberg (district)
Duchy of Saxe-Meiningen